CEAC may be an abbreviation for:
European Civil Aviation Conference (French: Conférence Européenne de l'Aviation Civile)
Controlled Environment Agriculture Center at the University of Arizona
Central European Aluminum Company
Compagnie Européenne d'Accumulateurs, former French battery seller, see Exide
Centre for Experimental Art and Communication, a Canadian artist-run centre